Avdotyino is the name of several rural localities in Russia.

Arkhangelsk Oblast 
As of 2014, one rural locality in Arkhangelsk Oblast bears this name:

Avdotyino, Arkhangelsk Oblast, a village in Konevsky Selsoviet of Plesetsky District;

Kaluga Oblast 
As of 2014, one rural locality in Kaluga Oblast bears this name:
Avdotyino, Kaluga Oblast, a village in Maloyaroslavetsky District

Kostroma Oblast 
As of 2014, one rural locality in Kostroma Oblast bears this name:

Avdotyino, Kostroma Oblast, a village in Chernopenskoye Settlement of Kostromskoy District;

Moscow Oblast 
As of 2014, six rural localities in Moscow Oblast bear this name:

Avdotyino, Domodedovo, Moscow Oblast, a village under the administrative jurisdiction of Domodedovo City Under Oblast Jurisdiction; 
Avdotyino, Mozhaysky District, Moscow Oblast, a village in Goretovskoye Rural Settlement of Mozhaysky District; 
Avdotyino, Noginsky District, Moscow Oblast, a village in Yamkinskoye Rural Settlement of Noginsky District; 
Avdotyino, Aksinyinskoye Rural Settlement, Stupinsky District, Moscow Oblast, a selo in Aksinyinskoye Rural Settlement of Stupinsky District; 
Avdotyino, Semenovskoye Rural Settlement, Stupinsky District, Moscow Oblast, a village in Semenovskoye Rural Settlement of Stupinsky District; 
Avdotyino, Volokolamsky District, Moscow Oblast, a village in Kashinskoye Rural Settlement of Volokolamsky District;

Ryazan Oblast 
As of 2014, one rural locality in Ryazan Oblast bears this name:
Avdotyino, Ryazan Oblast, a village in Karnaukhovsky Rural Okrug of Shatsky District

Smolensk Oblast 
As of 2014, one rural locality in Smolensk Oblast bears this name:
Avdotyino, Smolensk Oblast, a village in Losnenskoye Rural Settlement of Pochinkovsky District

Ulyanovsk Oblast 
As of 2014, one rural locality in Ulyanovsk Oblast bears this name:
Avdotyino, Ulyanovsk Oblast, a village in Timiryazevsky Rural Okrug of Ulyanovsky District

Vladimir Oblast 
As of 2014, four rural localities in Vladimir Oblast bear this name:
Avdotyino, Kolchuginsky District, Vladimir Oblast, a village in Kolchuginsky District
Avdotyino, Kovrovsky District, Vladimir Oblast, a village in Kovrovsky District
Avdotyino, Sudogodsky District, Vladimir Oblast, a village in Sudogodsky District
Avdotyino, Yuryev-Polsky District, Vladimir Oblast, a selo in Yuryev-Polsky District

Vologda Oblast 
As of 2014, two rural localities in Vologda Oblast bear this name:
Avdotyino, Sosnovsky Selsoviet, Vologodsky District, Vologda Oblast, a village in Sosnovsky Selsoviet of Vologodsky District
Avdotyino, Spassky Selsoviet, Vologodsky District, Vologda Oblast, a village in Spassky Selsoviet of Vologodsky District

Yaroslavl Oblast 
As of 2014, one rural locality in Yaroslavl Oblast bears this name:
Avdotyino, Yaroslavl Oblast, a village in Ninorovsky Rural Okrug of Uglichsky District